Daniel Colen (born 1979) is an American artist based in New York. His work consists of painted sculptures appropriating low-cultural ephemera, graffiti-inspired paintings of text executed in paint, and installations.

Early life and education
Born in 1979 and raised in Leonia, New Jersey. His father, Sy Colen, a wood and clay sculptor, was a participant in the 2006 reality TV show Artstar. Colen attended Solomon Schechter Day School, and was raised Jewish. Colen graduated with a B.F.A. in Painting from the Rhode Island School of Design in 2001. After graduation he moved to the East Village in Manhattan, and by June 2006 he became a known artist.

Colen was close friends with artists Dash Snow and Ryan McGinley. In 2007, Snow and Colen shredded phone books in Jeffrey Deitch’s SoHo gallery for an installation called Nest or Hamster Nest. He was described by The Guardian as a "bad boy of post-pop New York". When Snow died in 2009 of a heroin overdose, Colen was greatly impacted and said he was determined to end his own addiction.

Work
Colen’s work has been exhibited at galleries including Deitch Projects, Gagosian Gallery (2006) and Gladstone Gallery in New York, Peres Projects in Berlin, as well as Venus and OHWOW in Los Angeles. He has shown work internationally in many exhibitions including “Potty Mouth, Potty War, Pot Roast, Pot is a Reality Kick” at Gagosian Gallery in New York, “USA Today” at the Royal Academy of Arts in London, the 2006 Whitney Biennial in New York, “Fantastic Politics” at the National Museum of Art, Architecture and Design in Oslo and “No Me” at Peres Projects in Berlin.  In 2011 he had a solo show at the Astrup Fearnley Museum in Oslo, Norway.

In his work, Secrets and Cymbals, Smoke and Scissors: My Friend Dash’s Wall in the Future (2004), Colen built an exact replica of a section of poster, photo and flyer-covered wall from friend Dash Snow's apartment. Each piece of visual material was handmade and attached to a Styrofoam copy of the wall.

His works are held in the collection of the Saatchi Gallery, the Whitney Museum of American Art, and the Astrup Fearnley Museum of Modern Art.

References

External links

Dan Colen on ArtFacts.Net
What to look for in the Whitney Biennial artnet.com
Dan Colen--Artwork--Saatchi Gallery

1979 births
Sculptors from New York (state)
21st-century American painters
21st-century American male artists
21st-century American sculptors
American male sculptors
Living people
People from Leonia, New Jersey
Rhode Island School of Design alumni
20th-century American sculptors
20th-century American painters
American male painters
20th-century American male artists